The Ernakulam–Lokmanya Tilak Terminus Duronto Express is a bi-weekly nonstop Duronto Express train between Kochi and Mumbai, running through the scenic Konkan Railway route. It is considered to be the 2nd  fastest option for train connectivity between Kochi and Mumbai.

Schedule

STATION.          ARRIVAL.     DEPARTURE
Ernakulam jn.      Starts.        21:30
Kozhikode Main.    00:42.         00:45
Mangaluru Jn.      03:50.         04:00
Madgaon Jn.        08:40.         08:50
Ratnagiri.         12:25.         12:30
Lokmanya Tilak     18:15.         Ends

History
The service of this train started on January 14, 2011 from Lokmanya Tilak Terminus to Ernakulam Junction. This train is a typical Duronto Express. It had no commercial stops in between the starting station and the ending station when introduced. Only technical halts were applied for this train for staff change, cleaning, water filling etc. However, because of low occupancy, all its technical halts except Udupi were converted into commercial halts.

Frequency

This train runs twice in a week. Train no: 12223 departs Lokmanya Tilak Terminus on Tuesdays and Saturdays and reaches Ernakulam Junction on Wednesdays and Sundays. Train no: 12224 departs Ernakulam Junction on Sundays and Wednesdays and reaches Lokmanya Tilak Terminus on Mondays and Thursdays.

Coach composition 
The rake has 4 Sleeper coaches, 6 AC three-tier coaches, 2 AC two-tier coaches, 1 AC first class, 1 pantry car and 2 EOG cars making a total of 15 coaches.

Traction
It is hauled by a Lallaguda based WAP-7 electric locomotive from end to end.

Routes and Halts
 Kozhikode (CLT)
 Mangalore Junction (MAJN)
 Udupi (UD) (Technical Halt) 
 Madgaon Junction(MAO)
 Ratnagiri (RN).
Ticket booking is not allowed to or from Udupi railway station as it is a technical halt stations.

Accidents
On 3 May 2015, 10 Coaches of Duronto Express derailed near Balli at 6.24 am shortly after departing from Madgaon Junction (MAO) . No casualties were reported

References

Sources
 Indiarailinfo.com link to track average time delays

Duronto Express trains
Rail transport in Kerala
Transport in Kochi
Transport in Mumbai
Rail transport in Maharashtra
Rail transport in Goa
Rail transport in Karnataka
Railway services introduced in 2011